Luzi is an Italian surname derived from the Latin noun Lux (Lutius = Lucius), meaning "light". Notable people with the surname include:

People
 Bruno Luzi, French football player and manager
Enrico Luzi, Italian actor
 Giulia Luzi, Italian actress
 Giuseppe Cozza-Luzi, Italian savant
 Luzio Luzi, Italian painter
 Mario Luzi, Italian poet
 Patrice Luzi, French football player
 Spiridion Luzi, Greek scholar, diplomat, and politician

See also
 Lucy
 Luce (disambiguation)
 Luci

Italian-language surnames
Latin-language surnames
Patronymic surnames